The hair hang is an aerial circus act where performers (usually young women) are suspended by their hair, performing acrobatic poses and/or manipulation. Some believe the act originated in South America; others claim the act hails from China. Performers hang suspended by their hair, which is tied into a hairhang rig; the techniques used to tie the performer's hair, and the acrobatic techniques involved in the act are key.

Many people underestimate the tensile strength of hair. However, the act still hurts, especially for new performers.

Hair hanging acts are prominently featured in the Cirque du Soleil touring productions Volta and Bazzar. In 2020, American violinist Lindsey Stirling hung from her hair while playing her signature piece Crystalize as part of her Home for the Holidays virtual concert.

See also
Circus skills
Iron jaw (circus)

References

External links
 Circus Hair-Hang Performer
 Proyecto Otradnoie
 Aerial Arts FAQ (Simply Circus)
 Simply Circus Hair Hang page
 "Daniela Valoskova: 'I have been hanging by my hair for twenty years, it always hurts'". Novinar 
 Capilotractées - Galapiat Cirque 

Circus skills
Human hair